Rowena Sweatman (born 10 February 1968) is a British judoka. She competed at the 1996 Summer Olympics.

Judo career
In 1986, she won the bronze medal in the 66kg weight category at the judo demonstration sport event as part of the 1986 Commonwealth Games. Sweatman became champion of Great Britain, winning the middleweight division at the British Judo Championships in 1988.

In 1994, she became the European champion at the 1994 European Judo Championships in Gdańsk, where she won the gold medal in the -66kg category. The following year she won a bronze medal at the 1995 European Judo Championships, in Birmingham. 

In 1996, she was selected to represent Great Britain at the 1996 Summer Olympics in Atlanta. She competed in the women's middleweight event, reaching the quarter finals before losing to Aneta Szczepańska. The following year in 1997, she claimed a second British title, but this time at the heavier weight class of half-heavyweight (-78kg).

References

External links
 

1968 births
Living people
British female judoka
Olympic judoka of Great Britain
Judoka at the 1996 Summer Olympics
People from Feltham
20th-century British women